A People's Tragedy: The Russian Revolution, 1891–1924 is a history book by British historian Orlando Figes on the Russian Revolution and the years leading up to it. It was written between 1989 and 1996, and first edition was published in 1996. A new 2nd edition was prepared for the centenary in 2017.

Background
The book chronicles Russian history from the Russian famine of 1891–1892, the response to which Figes argues to have severely weakened the Russian Empire, to the death of Lenin in 1924, when "the basic elements of the Stalinist regime  the one-party state, the system of terror and the cult of the personality  were all in place". According to Figes, "the whole of 1917 could be seen as a political battle between those who saw the revolution as a means of bringing the war to an end and those who saw the war as a means of bringing the revolution to an end".

Reception
A People's Tragedy won the Wolfson History Prize, the WH Smith Literary Award, the NCR Book Award, the Longman/History Today Book Prize and the Los Angeles Times Book Prize. In 2008, the Times Literary Supplement listed it as one of the "hundred most influential books since the war". Eric Hobsbawm, reviewing the book, called it a "very impressive piece of history-writing." Harvard University historian Richard Pipes, found scholarly shortcomings in it.

Release details

A 47 hour audiobook edition of A People's Tragedy narrated by Roger Davis was released in 2018. 

 
  First American Edition

References

1996 non-fiction books
Books about communism
Books about the Russian Revolution
History books about famine
Jonathan Cape books